The Embassy of the Republic of Turkey in Jakarta is the diplomatic mission of the Republic of Turkey to the Indonesia. Turkish Embassy in Jakarta was opened on 10 April 1957. The Turkish Embassy has been serving at its current chancellery in Kuningan, Jakarta since 1983.

The Embassy covers whole Indonesia and is also accredited to Timor-Leste since 2003. The Office of the Commercial Counselor was opened in April 2007 in the premises of Turkey Embassy. The Embassy has 21 Turkish and Indonesian personnel.

See also

 Embassy of Indonesia, Ankara
 Indonesia–Turkey relations

References

Indonesia–Turkey relations
Diplomatic missions of Turkey
Turkey